

Great Britain
Province of New Jersey – William Franklin, Governor (1763–1776)

Portugal
 Angola – 
 António de Vasconcelos, Governor (1758–1764)
 Francisco Inocéncio de Sousa Coutinho, Governor (1764–1772)
 Macau –
 Antonio de Mendonca Corte-Real, Governor of Macau (1761–1764)
 Jose Placido de Matos Saraiva, Governor of Macau (1764–1767)

Colonial governors
Colonial governors
1764